EWE Baskets Juniors, also Oldenburger TB, is a professional basketball team that is based in Oldenburg, Germany. The club's full name is Oldenburger Turnerbund. The team is a part of the bigger Basketball Bundesliga team EWE Baskets Oldenburg, and is used as a development team of EWE. The team cooperates with the Baskets Akademie Weser-Ems, which is the youth development academy of the Oldenburg professional team.

Honours
ProB
Winners (2): 2013–14, 2014–15

Season by season

Source: Eurobasket.com

References

Basketball teams in Germany